Misfits are an American horror punk band from Lodi, New Jersey. Formed in February 1977, the group originally included bassist Diane DiPiazza, vocalist and keyboardist Glenn Danzig and drummer Mr. Jim, who was replaced by Manny Martinez shortly after, with guitarist Franché Coma added in the fall of that year. The band went through a number of personnel changes, including adding Only's brother Doyle Wolfgang von Frankenstein on guitars in 1980, before breaking up in 1983. Only and Doyle reformed the Misfits in 1995 with new vocalist Michale Graves and drummer Dr. Chud. Doyle and Danzig rejoined the band in 2016, alongside drummer Dave Lombardo.

History

1977–1983 
The Misfits were formed in 1977 in Lodi, New Jersey, by Glenn Danzig. Danzig's first recruit to the Misfits was drummer Mr. Jim and bassist Diane DiPazza, however, DiPiazza never showed up. Mr. Jim was replaced by Manny Martinez shortly after. The two practiced in Martínez's garage, with Danzig on electric piano and Martínez on drums. The duo soon encountered Jerry Caiafa, who was dating a neighbor of Martínez's and had just received a bass guitar for Christmas. After performing as a three-piece for a number of months, which spawned their first single "Cough/Cool", the band added guitarist Frank "Franché Coma" Licata in October. By the end of the year they had also replaced Martínez with James "Mr. Jim" Catania. Misfits recorded its debut album Static Age in the first two months of 1978, but it remained unreleased until 1996. "Bullet" was issued in June 1978.

Coma left midway through a North American tour in October 1978, followed by Mr. Jim later in the month. They were replaced in November by Bobby "Steele" Kaufhold and Joey "Image" Poole, respectively. Coma was initially replaced by Rick Riley for two shows before Steele joined. After the release of two singles – "Horror Business" and "Night of the Living Dead" – Image left Misfits in December 1979 following conflicts with Danzig and Only. The group went on a short hiatus, before adding drummer Arthur Googy (real name Arthur McGuckin) in April 1980. Later in the year, Steele was replaced by Only's 16-year-old brother Paul Caiafa (originally a roadie for the band), who adopted the moniker Doyle. This lineup recorded the band's first album to be released, Walk Among Us, which was issued in March 1982. Googy left shortly after its release following an argument with Danzig.

Returning with former Black Flag drummer Roberto "Robo" Valverde, Misfits recorded its second album Earth AD/Wolfs Blood throughout late 1982 and early 1983. Robo left in August 1983, with Brian Damage (real name Brian Keats) brought in for scheduled tour dates later in the year. However, Danzig disbanded the group after a final show on October 29 which Rolling Stone writer Kory Grow described as "shambolic", during which former touring drummer Todd Swalla was forced to substitute for the drunken Damage. Earth AD/Wolfs Blood was released in December 1983, followed by single "Die, Die My Darling" in May 1984. Following the breakup of the Misfits, Danzig formed Samhain and later Danzig, while the Caiafa brothers formed Kryst the Conqueror.

1995 onwards 
After a legal case regarding ownership of the band's name, Only "secured the exclusive legal right to tour and record as the Misfits" in 1995 and reformed the band with Doyle. The pair initially invited Danzig to rejoin, who declined. During auditions for new bandmates, Only and Doyle recorded several demos with vocalist Eric Weiss and drummer Joel Gausten, although they were not official members of the band. Later in the year, vocalist Michael "Michale Graves Emanuel and drummer David "Dr. Chud" Calabrese joined the group, with their first shows coming in October. The new lineup released several recordings together, including American Psycho and Famous Monsters. Graves briefly departed in 1998, during which time Myke Hideous filled in on several tour dates.

Graves and Chud left midway through a show on October 25, 2000. Several guest musicians replaced them at later dates, including former member Joey Image, vocalist Zoli Téglás and drummer Ken "Renfield" Schalk. In early 2001, the group toured with a range of guests, including Eric Arce, former members Robo and Graves, former Black Flag guitarist Dez Cadena, and former Ramones drummer Marky Ramone. Both Cadena and Marky later became official members, before Doyle left the band in May 2001. Robo returned to replace Ramone in May 2005, remaining until November 2010 when he was replaced by Arce. In 2014, the band expanded to a four-piece with the addition of Only's son Jerry Caiafa II on guitar, although the following June it was announced that Cadena had to cease performing due to undergoing cancer treatment.

On May 12, 2016, it was announced that Danzig would be returning to the band for the first time since 1983, alongside guitarist Doyle, for a lineup dubbed "The original Misfits". In August, it was announced that former Slayer drummer Dave Lombardo would be joining as the fourth member of the group, with the first reunion shows taking place the following month.

Members

Current

Former 

|Marc Rizzo}}
|2015
|lead guitar
|
|}

Touring

Timeline

Lineups

Bibliography

References

External links 
 Misfits official website

Misfits